Kyle Schickner is an American film producer, writer, director, actor and a bisexual civil rights activist.  He is the founder of FenceSitter Films, a production company devoted to entertainment for women, and sexual and ethnic minorities.  He currently lives and works in Los Angeles, where he directs films, music videos, a Web series and commercials for his production company FenceSitterFilms.

Career
Schickner attended Harvard from 1993 to 1995 before dropping out to start Off-Off-Broadway theater company, Fencesitter Productions. Based out of the Stanford Meisner Theater, the company produced four successful plays, three of which were written and directed by Schickner himself.

While in college, inspired by hearing a talk given by bisexual rights activist Lani Ka'ahumanu, he formed BIAS (Bisexuals Achieving Solidarity) the first college bisexual rights group in the United States.  After seeking out the campus' gay and lesbian organization, Schickner recalls, "I knew I was bisexual, but those who ran the club didn't believe it." He later went on to appear on CNN, Montel Williams, Jane Pratt and several other national television shows, helping to give visibility to what was at that time a largely invisible community.

After writing and producing three successful plays, Schickner moved to cinema in hope of reaching a wider audience.  In 1995, FenceSitter Films (the former Fencesitter Productions) started production on Rose by Any Other Name..., a film based on Schickner's most successful play. According to the official website, FenceSitter Films was "founded on the belief that films don't need straight white men as heroes in order to be successful and entertaining." He says, "I wanted to make films [that] a person of color, a woman, or a bisexual person would enjoy watching." Schickner has written and directed five feature films, several commercials and music videos and is now currently producing a Web series of Rose by Any Other Name....

His features include romantic comedy Rose by Any Other Name..., mockumentary Full Frontal, and the critically acclaimed thriller Strange Fruit. His most current feature film, Steam, stars Oscar-nominated actress Ruby Dee, 1980s and indie icon Ally Sheedy as well as up-and-coming young actress Kate Siegel.

In late 2008 into 2009 Schickner began working with an American Cable TV Network to spin-off his original work Rose by Any Other Name... into a weekly TV series. However, according to Schickner "at the 11th hour as they were setting up to shoot the pilot the network expressed concern over how the cutting-edge social theme might play with some of their core viewership and decided to look at more data to see what kind of response the show might get".  So with the assistance of American Institute of Bisexuality, FenceSitter Films turned it into a Web series with each Webisode being posted on their YouTube channel.

Filmography

Feature films
Steam (2007) (producer, director, writer)
Paradise Lost (2006) (producer, director, writer, actor)
Strange Fruit (2004) (producer, director, writer, actor)
Full Frontal (2001) (executive producer, director, writer, actor)
Rose by Any Other Name... (1997) (producer director, writer, actor)

Web series
Rose by Any Other Name... (2009)(producer director, writer, actor)

References

External links 

FenceSitter Films official site
FenceSitter Films Youtube Channel

Living people
People from New Jersey
Rutgers University alumni
American film directors
American feminist writers
Bisexual men
Bisexual rights activists
LGBT people from New Jersey
American LGBT rights activists
Bisexual feminists
Male feminists
Year of birth missing (living people)
American bisexual writers